M. C. Joshi (1928–1983) from Belgaum, India was a nuclear physicist and the founder and head of the university department of physics, University of Mumbai. The university department of physics was established in 1971.

The University department of physics, under Joshi's guidance, took pioneering efforts in developing an Ion implantation facility in the early seventies and has been in the forefront in studying different aspects of ion beam modifications of material properties. Joshi guided several students for their Ph.Ds in physics.

Joshi followed Gandhian way of life. After earning a  Ph.D. (1964)  in physics from Tata Institute of Fundamental Research, he worked with several projects from Bhabha Atomic Research Centre and Tata Institute of Fundamental Research. Before joining the department of physics, University of Mumbai in 1971  he was with the Institute of Physics, University of Uppsala, Uppsala, Sweden. Joshi nurtured the department of physics, University of Mumbai from its birth until he died in 1983, aged 55.

Select work

 M. C. Joshi, B. N. Subba Rao, B. V. Thosar, M1 transitions in 141 Pr and 191 Ir, - Il Nuovo Cimento (1955–1965), 1958 – Springer 
 B. V. Thosar, M. C. Joshi, R. P. Sharma, K. G. Prasad, Internal conversion studies of the 2+--> 0+ transitions in some deformed even …
- Nuclear Physics, 1964 - Elsevier
 P. Sekhar, M. C. Joshi, K. L. Narsimhan and S. Guha, Solid State Communications, 26 (1978) 973
 L. E. Thailamani and M.C. Joshi, Nuclear Instruments and Methods, (1982)
 V. K. Asundi, M. C. Joshi et al., Radiation Effects, 49 (1980) 39

References

 Physics Department, University of Mumbai

Indian nuclear physicists
Kannada people
1983 deaths
1928 births
People from Belgaum
20th-century Indian physicists
Scientists from Karnataka